Mostafa Rahmani (also Romanized as Moşţafá Raḩmānī; also known as Kalāteh-ye Moşţafá and Kalāteh Moşţafá) is a village in Sedeh Rural District, Sedeh District, Qaen County, South Khorasan Province, Iran. At the 2006 census, its population was 36, in 12 families.

References 

Populated places in Qaen County